The men's discus throw event at the 1998 World Junior Championships in Athletics was held in Annecy, France, at Parc des Sports on 29 and 30 July.  A 2 kg (senior implement) discus was used.

Medalists

Results

Final
30 July

Qualifications
29 Jul

Group A

Group B

Participation
According to an unofficial count, 28 athletes from 20 countries participated in the event.

References

Discus throw
Discus throw at the World Athletics U20 Championships